Zhongyuan culture refers to the culture of Zhongyuan (Central Plains) of China, centered in much of Henan province and parts of nearby provinces like Shandong, Shanxi, Hebei and Shaanxi. It is widely held to be one of the main cradles of Han ethnic, later modern Chinese civilization. Historically, the region has spent much of the past two millennia being the political core of successive orthodox Chinese dynasties, resulting in it having significant cultural influences across the entire East Asia. It is also constantly evolving and changing throughout history.

Origin

Language

Literature

Cuisine

Science and inventions

Philosophy and religions

Performing arts

Visual arts

Martial arts

See also
Chinese culture

References

Chinese culture
Culture in Hebei
Culture in Henan
Culture in Shaanxi